Billingslea is a surname. Notable people with the surname include:

Alma Jean Billingslea (born 1946), American Civil Rights activist and teacher
Beau Billingslea (born 1944), American actor
Charles Billingslea (1914–1989), United States Army major general
Janelle Billingslea, American sprinter
Joe Billingslea (born 1937), American singer and performer
Marshall Billingslea, American government official